John Streeter Manifold  (21 April 1915 – 19 April 1985) was an Australian poet and critic. He was born in Melbourne, into a well known Camperdown family. He was educated at Geelong Grammar School, and read modern languages at Jesus College, Cambridge. While in Cambridge he joined the Communist Party of Great Britain. He was involved in an attempt to create a successor (Poetry and the People) to Left Review, when the latter folded in 1938.

He then worked in Germany, in publishing. During World War II he served in intelligence in the British Army, in the Middle East, Africa and France. He was a published war poet; Trident, with Hubert Nicholson and David Martin, was published by Randall Swingler's Fore Publications in 1944.

In 1949 he returned to Australia, settling in Brisbane. He was a founder in 1950 of the Realist Writers Group. He then worked and published mostly on Australian songs and music, reciting ballads at arts festivals. In the 1984 Australia Day Honours he was made a Member of the Order of Australia (AM) for "service to literature as a poet and musician". He died in Brisbane.

Bibliography

Poetry collections
 Verses 1930-1933 (1933)
 The Death of Ned Kelly and Other Ballads (1941)
 Trident (1944)
 Selected Verse (1946)
 Nightmares and Sunhorses (1961) poems 
 Poems (1967)
 Op 8 : poems 1961-69 (1971)
 Six Sonnets on Human Ecology (1974)
 Sonnets and Sundries (1977)
 Collected Verse (1971)
 On My Selection (1983)

Compiler
 Bandicoot Ballads (1955)
 The Penguin Australian Song Book (1964)

Non-fiction
 The Amorous Flute : An unprofessional handbook for recorder players and all amateurs of music (1948)
 The Violin, the Banjo and the Bones: An Essay on the Instruments of Bush Music (1957) 
 Who Wrote the Ballads?: Notes on Australian Folksong (1964)
 The Changing Face of Realism (1971)

Individual poems
 "The Tomb of Lt. John Learmonth, AIF"

References

Rodney Hall (1978), John Manifold: an introduction to the man and his work
Ian Hamilton (editor) (1994), The Oxford Companion to Twentieth-Century Poetry in English, p. 338.
Some versions of Manifold: Brisbane and the 'myth' of John Manifold

1915 births
1985 deaths
Australian people of English descent
Alumni of Jesus College, Cambridge
People educated at Geelong Grammar School
20th-century Australian poets
Australian male poets
20th-century Australian male writers
Members of the Order of Australia
British Army personnel of World War II